Kanji is a Japanese writing system that can refer to all Chinese characters in general, especially in the Japanese Language. 

Kanji may also refer to:

People 
 Cangjie, a legendary Chinese historiographer
 Kanji Swami, a teacher of Jainism

Places 
 Kanji, Jammu and Kashmir, a village in the Leh district in north India
 Kanji, Tamil Nadu, a village in Tiruvannamalai District in south India

Other 
 Kanji (given name), a masculine Japanese given name
 Cangjie input method (cj), a method of computer entry of Chinese characters
 Congee or kanji, a semi-liquid food made from rice
 Kanji (drink), an Indian drink prepared for the Holi festival
 Kanji (era), a Japanese era name (1087–1094)
 Kanji (food), a rice water based dish traditionally prepared in Odisha
 Kanji bush, the common name of the Australian shrub Acacia inaequilatera

See also 
 Kanzi
 Kanzi (apple)